Étienne Perruchon (1958 – 14 May 2019) was a French composer, known mainly for his film scores. Perruchon is also particularly known for the "Dogorian Musics" illustrating the world of Dogora, an imaginary country in Central Europe (film Dogora: Ouvrons les yeux).

He died on May 14, 2019 at the age of 61.

Some works 

 French Fried Vacation 3
 Dogora: Ouvrons les yeux
 Tchikidan.
 Skaanza.
 Voir la mer
 Beauties at War
 The Suicide Shop

References

External links 
 
 
 

1958 births
2019 deaths
People from Haute-Savoie
French film score composers
20th-century French composers
21st-century French composers